Donna Jean Thatcher Godchaux-MacKay (born August 22, 1947) is an American singer who was a member of the Grateful Dead from 1972 until 1979.

Biography 
Donna Jean Thatcher was born in Florence, Alabama. Prior to 1970, she had worked as a session singer in Muscle Shoals, Alabama, eventually singing with a group called Southern Comfort and appearing as a backup singer on at least two #1 hit songs: "When a Man Loves a Woman" by Percy Sledge in 1966 and "Suspicious Minds" by Elvis Presley in 1969. Her vocals were featured on other classic recordings by Boz Scaggs and Duane Allman, Cher, Joe Tex, Neil Diamond and many others. She then moved to California and met future fellow Grateful Dead member Keith Godchaux, whom she married in 1970.

Donna introduced Keith to Jerry Garcia after Garcia's performance at San Francisco's Keystone Korner in September 1971. At the time, Donna Jean was not working as a musician. She joined the band shortly afterwards, remaining a member until February 1979.

Donna Jean provided backing and lead vocals in the group's music. During their membership in the Grateful Dead, the couple also issued the mostly self-written Keith & Donna album in 1975 with Jerry Garcia as a Keith and Donna Band member.  In turn, they performed as part of the Jerry Garcia Band. Godchaux possesses a mezzo-soprano vocal range. 

Keith and Donna's son, Zion "Rock" Godchaux of BoomBox, was born in 1974.
After the Grateful Dead, the couple started the Heart of Gold Band.

Donna did not perform again with any Grateful Dead band members until after the death of Jerry Garcia.  Shortly after her husband's death in 1980, she married bassist David MacKay (former Fiddleworms member and bassist for the Donna Jean Godchaux Band) and the couple moved to her childhood town of Florence, Alabama, to record at the Muscle Shoals Sound Studio.

In 2009, Donna Jean formed a brand new band, the Donna Jean Godchaux Band, with Jeff Mattson (of Phil Lesh and Friends, Zen Tricksters, and Dark Star Orchestra), after re-entering the music scene with Mattson and Mookie Siegel (of David Nelson Band, Phil Lesh and Friends, and Ratdog) to form Kettle Joe's Psychedelic Swamp Revue, later known as Donna Jean & the Tricksters. She occasionally makes guest appearances with Bob Weir & RatDog, Zero & Steve Kimock, New Riders of the Purple Sage, Dark Star Orchestra and Dead & Company. She also continues to be involved in archival Grateful Dead projects.

In 1994, Donna Jean was inducted into the Rock and Roll Hall of Fame as a member of the Grateful Dead.  She resides in Killen, Alabama, and remains an active member of the Muscle Shoals music scene when not touring with the Donna Jean Godchaux Band with Jeff Mattson.

Discography

As group leader or co-leader 

 Keith & Donna – Keith and Donna Godchaux – 1975
 Playing in the Heart of Gold Band – The Ghosts – 1984
 The Heart of Gold Band – The Heart of Gold Band – 1986
 Donna Jean – The Donna Jean Band – 1998
 At the Table – The Heart of Gold Band – 2004
 Donna Jean and the Tricksters – Donna Jean and the Tricksters – 2008
 Back Around – Donna Jean Godchaux Band with Jeff Mattson – 2014

With the Grateful Dead 

Donna Godchaux was a member of the Grateful Dead from 1972 to 1979 and appears on many of the band's albums.

With other artists 
Donna Godchaux (née Donna Thatcher) has contributed background or lead vocals on many albums by different artists.
Singles
 "When a Man Loves a Woman" / "Love Me Like You Mean It" – Percy Sledge – 1966
 "Suspicious Minds" / "You'll Think of Me" – Elvis Presley – 1969
Videos
 Muscle Shoals – various artists – 2013
 Move Me Brightly – various artists – 2013
Albums
 From Elvis in Memphis – Elvis Presley – 1969
 From Memphis to Vegas/From Vegas to Memphis – Elvis Presley – 1969
 3614 Jackson Highway – Cher – 1969
 Boz Scaggs – Boz Scaggs – 1969
 Ton-Ton Macoute! – Johnny Jenkins – 1970
 Ace – Bob Weir – 1972
 Demon in Disguise – David Bromberg – 1972
 Gypsy Cowboy – New Riders of the Purple Sage – 1972
 The Adventures of Panama Red – New Riders of the Purple Sage – 1973
 Tales of the Great Rum Runners – Robert Hunter – 1974
 Tiger Rose – Robert Hunter – 1975
 Reflections – Jerry Garcia – 1976
 Cats Under the Stars – Jerry Garcia Band – 1977
 Here Goes Nothing – Zero – 1987
 Laughing Water – Jazz Is Dead – 1999
Don't Let Go – Jerry Garcia Band – 2001
 Worcester, MA, 4/4/73 – New Riders of the Purple Sage – 2003
 Pure Jerry: Theatre 1839, San Francisco, July 29 & 30, 1977 – Jerry Garcia Band – 2004
 Pure Jerry: Warner Theatre, March 18, 1978 – Jerry Garcia Band – 2005
 For Rex: The Black Tie Dye Ball – The Zen Tricksters and various artists – 2006
 Pure Jerry: Bay Area 1978 – Jerry Garcia Band – 2009
 Garcia Live Volume Four – Jerry Garcia Band – 2014
 Garcia Live Volume Seven – Jerry Garcia Band – 2016
 Garcia Live Volume 17 – Jerry Garcia Band – 2021

See also
 Muscle Shoals, Alabama
 FAME Studios
 Muscle Shoals Sound Studios

References

External links
 Donna Jean Godchaux Band with Jeff Mattson official website
 Grateful Dead official website
 The Music Never Stopped: The Musical Journey of Donna Jean Godcheaux-McKay From honesttune.com.
Donna Jean Godchaux Interview NAMM Oral History Library (2017)

1947 births
Living people
American women rock singers
American mezzo-sopranos
Grateful Dead members
Singers from Alabama
Musicians from Florence, Alabama
Heart of Gold Band members
21st-century American women singers
21st-century American singers
20th-century American women singers
20th-century American singers
Jerry Garcia Band members